Esfeh (also known as Esfe, Isfeh, and Ispeh) is a village in Dasht Rural District, in the Central District of Shahreza County, Isfahan Province, Iran. At the 2006 census, its population was 269, in 80 families.

References 

Populated places in Shahreza County